The Bartow Polkers were a short-lived professional minor league baseball team, based in Bartow, Florida that existed from 1919 until 1920. The team was a charter member of the then Class D Florida State League.

References
Baseball Reference - Bartow, Florida

Baseball teams established in 1919
Defunct Florida State League teams
1919 establishments in Florida
1920 disestablishments in Florida
Defunct baseball teams in Florida
Sports clubs disestablished in 1920
Baseball teams disestablished in 1920